Coombe Road was a railway station on the Woodside and South Croydon Joint Railway in London. When it was closed it was owned and managed by British Rail.

History
A  link between the Mid-Kent Line at Woodside and the Oxted Line at  known as the Woodside and South Croydon Joint Railway was authorised in 1880. Opened on 10 August 1885, it was jointly worked by the London, Brighton and South Coast Railway and the South Eastern Railway. with the only intermediate station at Coombe Lane.

As part of a scheme to increase patronage using Kitson steam railmotors designed by Wainwright, a railway halt was provided on the north side of Bingham Road in Addiscombe on 1 September 1906. , also on the Woodside and South Croydon line, was opened on the same day, part of four such halts in the London area; the others being  and Beeches Halt. Despite new construction along the route of the line, passenger loadings were light and working expenses generally exceeded farebox revenue. The line was a candidate for wartime economies during the First World War and the halts at Bingham Road and Spencer Road were closed on 14 March 1915 upon which the railmotor service ceased, with full closure of the line following on 31 December 1916. The line was reopened and electrified by the Southern Railway on 30 September 1935. The former Coombe Lane station was completely rebuilt and given the name Coombe Road.
The station's platforms were nevertheless extended as part of a mid-1950s scheme to allow it to accommodate 10-car trains. Full closure was proposed in the Beeching Report but a reprieve was granted on the basis that some hardship would be caused. The inevitable closure of the line came in 1983, with the last train departing at 19:30 from Sanderstead on Friday 13 May and official closure following on 16 May.

Present day
The track was lifted and the station buildings were demolished within one year after closure.  Tramlink services reusing the railway alignment at Coombe Road commenced on 10 May 2000. A tramstop (Lloyd Park tram stop) was constructed 200 metres to the east of the former station to serve the same area.

References

Notes

Sources

Disused railway stations in the London Borough of Croydon
Former Woodside and South Croydon Joint Railway stations
Railway stations in Great Britain opened in 1885
Railway stations in Great Britain closed in 1917
Railway stations in Great Britain opened in 1935
Railway stations in Great Britain closed in 1983